Aghbolagh-e Hasan Kandi (also Romanized as Āghbolāgh-e Ḩasan Kandī; also known as Āghbolāgh, Āq Bolāgh, and Āqbolāgh-e Ḩasan Kandī) is a village in Aliabad Rural District, in the Central District of Hashtrud County, East Azerbaijan Province, Iran. At the 2006 census, its population was 144, in 25 families.

References 

Towns and villages in Hashtrud County